Bilgin may refer to:

Given name
 Bilgin Defterli (born 1980), Turkish women's footballer

Surname
 Ali Bilgin (born 1981), German-born Turkish footballer
 Ayse Bilgin, Australian statistician
 Erol Bilgin (born 1987), Turkish European weightlifter

Turkish-language surnames